Harry Hoijer (September 6, 1904 – March 11, 1976) was a linguist and anthropologist who worked on primarily Athabaskan languages and culture. He additionally documented the Tonkawa language, which is now extinct. Hoijer's few works make up the bulk of material on this language. Hoijer was a student of Edward Sapir.

Hoijer contributed greatly to the documentation of the Southern and Pacific Coast Athabaskan languages and to the reconstruction of proto-Athabaskan. Harry Hoijer collected a large number of valuable fieldnotes on many Athabaskan languages, which are unpublished. Some of his notes on Lipan Apache and the Tonkawa language are lost.

Hoijer coined the term "Sapir–Whorf hypothesis".

Notes

Bibliography

 
 
 Earle, Timothy (ed.) (1984): On the Evolution of Complex Societies: Essays in Honor of Harry Hoijer 1982, Undena (for the UCLA Dept.of Anthr.), Malibu, CA..
 
 
 Maquet, Jacques (ed.)(1980), articles by Joseph Greenberg, Dell Hymes, Paul W. Friederich:On Linguistic Anthropology: Essays in Honor of Harry Hoijer 1979, Undena (for the UCLA Dept. of Anthr.), Malibu, CA..
 Maquet, Jacques (ed.)(1982): On Symbols in Anthropology: Essays in Honor of Harry Hoijer 1980, Undena (for the UCLA Dept. of Anthr.), Malibu, CA..
 Maquet, Jacques, Daniels, Nancy  (eds.) (1984), articles by Sidney Mintz, Maurice Godelier, Bruce Trigger: On Marxian Perspectives in Anthropology. Essays in Honor of Harry Hoijer, 1981, Undena (for the UCLA Dept. of Anthr.), Malibu, CA.
 Williams, B. J., (ed.)(1986), articles by L.L. Cavelli-Sforza, et alii: On Evolutionary Anthropology. Essays in Honor of Harry Hoijer 1983, Undena (for the UCLA Dept. of Anthr.), Malibu, CA..

Works by Hoijer
 [Beals, Ralph L].; & Hoijer, Harry. (1953). An introduction to anthropology. New York: Macmillan Company. (Republished 1959, 1965, and 1971).
 Hoijer, Harry. (n.d.). Chiricahua Apache stems. [Unpublished manuscript].
 Hoijer, Harry. (n.d.). Mescalero Apache stems. [Unpublished manuscript].
 Hoijer, Harry. (1933). Tonkawa: An Indian language of Texas. New York: Columbia University. (Extract from Handbook of American Indian languages, Vol. 3).
 
 
 
 Hoijer, Harry. (1945). Navaho phonology. University of New Mexico publications in anthropology, (No. 1).
 
 
 Hoijer, Harry.  (1946).  Chiricahua Apache.  In C. Osgood (Ed.), Linguistic structures in North America.  New York: Wenner-Green Foundation for Anthropological Research.
 
 
 
 
 
 
 
 
 Hoijer, Harry. (1963). The Athapaskan languages. In H. Hoijer (Ed.), Studies in the Athapaskan languages (pp. 1–29). Berkeley: University of California Press.
 
 
 
 
 Hoijer, Harry. (1970). A Navajo lexicon. University of California Publications in Linguistics (No. 78). Berkeley: University of California Press.
 Hoijer, Harry.  (1971).  Athapaskan morphology.  In J. Sawyer (Ed.), Studies in American Indian languages (pp. 113–147).  University of California publications in linguistics (No. 65).  Berkeley: University of California Press.
 Hoijer, Harry. (1971). The position of the Apachean languages in the Athpaskan stock. In K. H. Basso & M. E. Opler (Eds.), Apachean culture history and ethnology (pp. 3–6). Tucson: University of Arizona Press.
 Hoijer, Harry. (1971). “Patterns of Meaning in Navaho.” In Themes in Culture. (eds. Zamora, Mario; Mahar, J.M.; and Orenstein, Henry.). Quezon City: Kayumanggi Publishers. 227–237.
 
 Hoijer, Harry; & Opler, Morris E.  (1938).  Chiricahua and Mescalero Apache texts.  The University of Chicago publications in anthropology; Linguistic series.  Chicago: University of Chicago Press.  (Reprinted 1964 by Chicago: University of Chicago Press; in 1970 by Chicago: University of Chicago Press; & in 1980 under H. Hoijer by New York: AMS Press).

Works edited by Hoijer
Hoijer, Harry (Ed.). (1954). Language in culture: Conference on the interrelations of language and other aspects of culture. Chicago: University of Chicago Press.
 Hoijer, Harry (Ed.). (1963). Studies in the Athapaskan languages. University of California publications in linguistics (No. 29). Berkeley: University of California Press.
 Sapir, Edward, & Hoijer, Harry. (1967). Navaho texts. William Dwight Whitney series, Linguistic Society of America.
 Sapir, Edward, & Hoijer, Harry. (1967). Phonology and morphology of the Navaho language. Berkeley: University of California Press.

External links
 Harry Hoijer (a very short bio)
 Harry Hoijer Collection (American Philosophical Society)
 Chiricahua and Mescalero Apache Texts (by Harry Hoijer & Morris Opler)

1904 births
1976 deaths
Linguists from the United States
University of Chicago alumni
Presidents of the American Anthropological Association
Linguists of Na-Dene languages
Linguists of Navajo
Linguists of Tonkawa
Linguistic Society of America presidents
20th-century American anthropologists
20th-century linguists